The 2010 Adur District Council election took place on 6 May 2010 to elect members of Adur District Council in West Sussex, England. Half of the council was up for election and the Conservative Party stayed in overall control of the council.

After the election, the composition of the council was:
Conservative 25
Liberal Democrat 2
Shoreham Beach Residents Association 2

Results
The results saw the Conservatives remain in control of the council after winning 12 of the 15 seats which were contested. They regained seats in Buckingham and Southlands wards which had been lost when the sitting councillors Gavin Ayling and Carl English had defected to the Liberal Democrats. However the Conservatives also lost a seat to the Liberal Democrats in Eastbrook, where Gavin Ayling was elected as a Liberal Democrat.

Ward results

References

2010
2010 English local elections
May 2010 events in the United Kingdom
2010s in West Sussex